Ma Chak Shun (born 2 March 1996) is a footballer who plays as a defender for Hong Kong Women League club Happy Valley AA. Born in Mainland China, she is also a futsal player, and represented Hong Kong internationally in both football and futsal.

International career
Ma Chak Shun has been capped for Hong Kong at senior level in both football and futsal. In football, she represented Hong Kong at two AFC U-19 Women's Championship editions (2013 and 2015), two EAFF E-1 Football Championship editions (2017 and 2019), the 2018 AFC Women's Asian Cup qualification, the 2018 Asian Games and the 2020 AFC Women's Olympic Qualifying Tournament.

In futsal, Ma Chak Shun played for Hong Kong at the 2015 AFC Women's Futsal Championship.

See also
List of Hong Kong women's international footballers

References

1996 births
Living people
Footballers from Guangdong
Hong Kong women's futsal players
Hong Kong women's footballers
Women's association football defenders
Hong Kong women's international footballers